James Kenneth Woodward, known professionally as J.K. Woodward, is a comic book artist known for illustrating the monthly series Fallen Angel, published by IDW Publishing.  Woodward has employed painting, digital assistance, as well as the more traditional pencil-and-ink and CMYK color method in his work.

Early life
James Kenneth Woodward was born in the Northeast United States.

Career
Woodward considered either a career as a rock musician or artist. He ultimately chose the latter and moved to Los Angeles, where he spent some years experimenting with his artistic style. He subsequently followed the example of one of his idols, David Bowie, and moved to Germany, where he went into self-publishing, producing a comic book composed of his expressionist paintings called Flesh Angels. He followed this up with an anthology comedic series called These Things Happen.

He then relocated to Desert Hot Springs, California, where he collaborated with A. David Lewis on the independent comic book Mortal Coils, and with Michael Colbert on the Digital Webbing Presents series Crazy Mary, for which he continues to do covers. Crazy Mary was noticed by IDW Publishing, which offered him the job of illustrating a CSI: NY miniseries. He subsequently illustrated a story in Boom! Studios' Zombie Tales. When Peter David moved his series, Fallen Angel to IDW, Woodward was chosen as the regular artist.

His painted work eventually caught the attention of Marvel editor, Mike Marts, who hired him to illustrate X-Men Origins: The Beast, which was released September 2008.

Personal life
After relocating from Desert Hot Springs to Long Beach, California, Woodward moved to Long Island City in Queens, New York.

In October 2012, Woodward and his wife lost their home and almost all of their belongings to Hurricane Sandy. He put his original artwork for the Star Trek: The Next Generation/Doctor Who: Assimilation miniseries up for sale in order to raise funds to recover.

Bibliography

Star Trek: The Next Generation/Doctor Who: Assimilation2 – issue 8 of 8 (IDW); December 2012
Star Trek: The Next Generation/Doctor Who: Assimilation2 – issue 7 of 8 (IDW); November 2012
Star Trek: The Next Generation/Doctor Who: Assimilation2 – issue 6 of 8 (IDW); October 2012
Star Trek: The Next Generation/Doctor Who: Assimilation2 – issue 5 of 8 (IDW); September 2012
Star Trek: The Next Generation/Doctor Who: Assimilation2 – issue 4 of 8 (IDW); August 2012
Star Trek: The Next Generation/Doctor Who: Assimilation2 – issue 3 of 8 (IDW); July 2012
Star Trek: The Next Generation/Doctor Who: Assimilation2 – issue 2 of 8 (IDW); June 2012
Star Trek: The Next Generation/Doctor Who: Assimilation2 – issue 1 of 8 (IDW); May 2012
Star Trek: Captain's Log – Pike (IDW); September 2010
Belladonna – graphic novel (IDW); February 2010
Weekly World News #1 cover-retail incentive (IDW); January 2010
Star Trek: Alien Spotlight – 4000 Throats (IDW); April 2009
More Digressions-paperback cover (Mad Norwegian Press); March 2009
Rogue Dragon-paperback cover (IDW); February 2009
Star Trek: The Last Generation #3 – Cover (IDW); December 2008
Necronomicon #4 – Cover (BOOM! Studios); November 2008
Fall of Cthulhu: God Wars #2 – Cover (Boom! Studios); November 2200;
Star Trek: The Last Generation #2 – Cover (IDW); November 2008
Necronomicon #3 – Cover (BOOM! Studios); October 2008
Fall of Cthulhu: God Wars #1 – Cover (BOOM! Studios); October 2008
Star Trek: The Last Generation #1 – Cover (IDW); October 2008
The Rising #2 – Cover (BOOM! Studios); October 2008
Necronomicon #2 – Cover (BOOM! Studios); September 2008
X-Men Origins: The Beast (Marvel Comics)
The Rising #1 – Cover (BOOM! Studios)
Fallen Angel #29 (IDW); August 2008
Necronomicon #1 – Cover (BOOM! Studios); August 2008
Star Trek: New Frontier #2 – retailer incentive cover (IDW); April 2008
Negative Burn #12; July 2007
CSI: Crime Scene Investigation: Dying in the Gutters #1 – Cover (IDW); August 2006
CSI: NY – Bloody Murder #5 – 'Chapter Five—Curtain Call' (IDW); November 2005
CSI: NY – Bloody Murder #3 – Chapter Three: Creatures of the Night (IDW); September 2005
CSI: NY – Bloody Murder #4 – Chapter Four: Blood Tales (IDW); September 2005
CSI: NY – Bloody Murder #2 – Chapter Two: Where Wolf? (IDW); August 2005
Bits and Pieces #2 (Ronin Studios); August 2005
CSI: NY – Bloody Murder #1 – Chapter One: Beast Moon (IDW); July 2005
Digital Webbing Presents #23 – "Damage Control"/"Crazy Mary" (DWP), May 2005
Zombie Tales #1 (BOOM! Studios); April 2005
Digital Webbing Presents #21 – "Zombie Tales" (DWP); March 2005
Digital Webbing Presents #16 – "Crazy Mary" (DWP); July 2004
Mortal Coils – TPB (Caption Box); July 2004
The Foot Soldiers TPB – Volume 2; March 2002
Fly Boys #1; November 1999
Art for Kill Shakespeare: The Board Game

References

External links

American comics artists
Living people
Year of birth missing (living people)
People from Long Island City, Queens